The seventh and final season of the CBS police procedural series The Mentalist, created by Bruno Heller, premiered on November 30, 2014 and concluded with its 2-hour series finale on February 18, 2015.

Cast and characters

Main cast
 Simon Baker as Patrick Jane (13 episodes)
 Robin Tunney as Teresa Lisbon (13 episodes)
 Tim Kang as Kimball Cho (13 episodes)
 Rockmond Dunbar as Dennis Abbott (13 episodes)
 Joe Adler as Jason Wylie (13 episodes)
 Josie Loren as Michelle Vega (10 episodes)

Recurring cast
 Christine Adams as Lena Abbott (3 episodes)
 Tim Griffin as Ken Spackman (2 episodes)
 Garcelle Beauvais as Danitra Cass (2 episodes)
 Dylan Baker as Bill Peterson (2 episodes)
 Aubrey Deeker as Joseph Keller/Lazarus (2 episodes)

Notable guest stars
 Pedro Pascal as Marcus Pike ("Nothing But Blue Skies")
 Morena Baccarin as Erica Flynn ("Orange Blossom Ice Cream")
 Tangie Ambrose as Samantha Barsocky ("Copper Bullet")
 M. C. Gainey as Pete Barsocky ("Copper Bullet")
 Amanda Righetti as Grace Van Pelt Rigsby ("White Orchids")
 Owain Yeoman as Wayne Rigsby ("White Orchids")
 Derek Phillips as Stan Lisbon (2 episodes)
 Robert Belushi as Jimmy Lisbon (2 episodes)

Episodes

References

External links
 
 
 

2014 American television seasons
2015 American television seasons
The Mentalist seasons